HMNZS Takapu was a modified Moa class inshore patrol vessel of the Royal New Zealand Navy (RNZN).

She was built by 1980 by the Whangarei Engineering and Construction Company as a version re-engineered for use as an inshore survey vessel.

HMNZS Takapu completed service in 2000 and was sold into private ownership. The vessel was converted for private use following an extensive refit. HMNZS Takapu was renamed Takapu 2 following her decommissioning from the New Zealand Navy.

See also
Survey ships of the Royal New Zealand Navy

Survey ships of the Royal New Zealand Navy
Moa-class patrol boats
1980 ships